Ardfield, historically Ardofoyle, is a small village and civil parish on the south-west coast of County Cork, Ireland. It lies 8 kilometres south of Clonakilty and 11 kilometres east of Rosscarbery, near Galley Head. Ardfield's Roman Catholic church dates to 1832 and is within the ecclesiastical parish of Ardfield/Rathbarry.

Ardfield is home to St James' GAA Club, which fields both hurling and Gaelic football teams. Local amenities include the local Roman Catholic church, a school, a pub, Ardfield Creamery, a children's playground and two all-weather tennis courts.

The village is close to several beaches, including Red Strand and Long Strand.

See also
 List of towns and villages in Ireland

References

External links
Ardfield and Rathbarry local historical society web page
Ardfield Rathbarry Rowing Club

Towns and villages in County Cork